Ivo Steins (born 18 July 1992) is a Dutch handball player for Limburg Lions.

He represented the Dutch national team at the 2020 European Men's Handball Championship and 2022 European Men's Handball Championship.

References

External links

1992 births
Living people
Dutch male handball players
People from Voerendaal
Limburg Lions players
Sportspeople from Limburg (Netherlands)